Events in the year 1926 in the British Mandate of Palestine.

Incumbents
 High Commissioner – Herbert Onslow Plumer
 Emir of Transjordan – Abdullah I bin al-Hussein
 Prime Minister of Transjordan – 'Ali Rida Basha al-Rikabi until 26 June; Hasan Khalid Abu al-Huda

Events

 5 March – The British High Commissioner grants an exclusive 70-year concession to Pinhas Rutenberg of the Palestine Electric Corporation for production and distribution of electric power utilize the water of the Jordan River and the Yarmouk River (see First Jordan Hydro-Electric Power House)
 1 April – The Transjordan Frontier Force is formed as a para-military border guard to defend the northern and southern borders of the Transjordan region.

Unknown dates
 The founding of the kibbutz Ramat David.
 The founding of the moshav Beit She'arim by a group of Jewish immigrants from Yugoslavia.
 The founding of the agricultural settlement Bayit VaGan, which was originally geared towards Orthodox Jews.
 The founding of the moshav Karkur, one of the two original communities of Jewish agriculturalists that combined in 1969 to form Pardes Hanna-Karkur.

Notable births
 10 January – Musallam Bseiso, Palestinian Arab thinker, intellectual, journalist, and politician (died 2017).
10 January – Yosef Kremerman, Israeli politician (died 1981).
 17 January – Yitzhak Moda'i, Israeli politician (died 1998).
 5 February – Avner Shaki, Israeli politician (died 2005).
 18 February – Meir Cohen-Avidov, Israeli politician (died 2015).
 5 March – Shimon Tzabar, Israeli artist, author, poet and Haaretz columnist (died 2007).
 8 March – Moshe Litvak, Israeli footballer and manager (died 2012).
 17 April – Aharon Yadlin, Israeli educator and politician (died 2022).
 23 May – Amos Degani, Israeli politician (died 2012).
 18 June – Avshalom Haviv, Irgun fighter and one of the Olei Hagardom (died 1947).
 19 June – Meir Pa'il, Israeli politician and Palmach officer (died 2015).
 20 June – Rehavam Ze'evi, Israeli general, politician and historian (died 2001).
 22 June – On Sarig, Israeli children's author (died 2012).
 30 June – Uriel Ofek, Israeli children's writer (died 1987).
 17 July – Shlomo Morag, Israeli professor at the Hebrew University of Jerusalem (died 1999).
 24 July – Zvi Dinstein, Israeli politician (died 2012).
 26 July – Meir Nakar, Irgun fighter and one of the Olei Hagardom (died 1947).
 2 August – George Habash, Christian Palestinian Arab nationalist, founder of the Popular Front for the Liberation of Palestine (died 2008).
 4 August – Hillel Omer, Israeli poet and writer (died 1990).
 13 August – Hanoch Bartov, Israeli author and journalist (died 2016).
 24 August – Nisim Aloni, Israeli playwright (died 1998).
 18 September - Eliezer Rafaeli, Israeli academic (died 2018).
 28 September – Mordechai Hod, Israeli military officer, commander of the Israeli Air Force (died 2003).
 29 September – Amos de-Shalit, Israeli nuclear physicist (died 1969).
 5 October – Avraham Adan, Israeli general (died 2012).
 7 October – Uri Lubrani, Israeli diplomat (died 2018). 
 23 November – Rafi Eitan, Israeli politician and former intelligence officer (died 2019).
10 December – Eliyahu Winograd, Israeli jurist, acting judge on the Supreme Court of Israel (died 2018).

 26 December – Yosef Shapira, Israeli politician and educator (died 2013).
27 December – Elyakum Shappira, Israeli conductor (died 2014)
Full date unknown
 
 Baruch Mizrahi – Arab-born convert to Judaism and Irgun fighter (died 1948).

Notable deaths

References

 
Palestine
Years in Mandatory Palestine